Allen County is a county located in the northwestern part of the U.S. state of Ohio. Its county seat and largest city is Lima. The county was created in 1820 and organized in 1831. The county is named in honor of Colonel John Allen, who was killed leading his men at the Battle of Frenchtown during the War of 1812.

Allen County comprises the Lima metropolitan statistical area, and as of the 2020 census, the population was 102,206.

History

Under the terms of the Treaty of Greenville signed in 1795, northwestern Ohio was reserved for Native Americans. Thus the area now comprising Allen County was off-limits to European settlement until the Treaty of Maumee Rapids in 1817.  Under the terms of this treaty, the Shawnee tribe was assigned reservations at Wapakonetta and at their "Hog Creek" settlement along the Ottawa River which comprised most of what is the present-day Shawnee Township.  The latter treaty opened the way for the Ohio Legislature on March 1, 1820, to create fourteen counties, including Allen, which was defined as Ranges 5 through 8 east and Towns 3 through 6 south.

The first permanent settlement within Allen County's present day bounds took place in 1824, when Christopher S. Wood and his family settled in section 7 of Bath Township.  The organization of Bath Township predates that of Allen County, with its first township meeting held on March 2, 1829.  On February 12, 1829, an act of the legislature set aside land for a "county town".  Wood was appointed commissioner to determine the location of this "seat of justice" for Allen County.  This was done on March 3, 1831, with Wood appointed as Town Director. He laid out plots of land to be sold in section 31 of Bath Township, and the plat was filed April 20, 1831, creating what was the beginning of the city of Lima.

Allen County organization's dates from the first meeting of the county commissioners, held on June 6, 1831. Present at this meeting were Commissioners James Daniels, John G. Wood, and Samuel Stewart. Also present was William G. Wood, county auditor; Adam White, county treasurer; and Henry Lippincott, sheriff.

The first court of justice was held in August 1831, and it is believed the assembly of men, in informal session, selected the name for the seat of justice by drawing names from a hat. The meeting was held at the cabin of James Daniels, which was on the bank of the Ottawa River near the current location of Market Street. Patrick G. Goode of Montgomery County, special prosecuting attorney at that session, is given credit for having offered up the name of "Lima" (capital of Peru and source of the quinine used to treat the malaria prevalent in the area of the Great Black Swamp).  At the County Commission session on June 6, 1831, the formation of a second township, Jackson, was approved.

In 1832 the Shawnees, including those living in the Hog Creek reservation (present day Shawnee Township), were removed to eastern Kansas.  They received payment of $30 000 in fifteen annual installments for their lands which had an estimated value of over $200 000 at that time.  They arrived at their new home with few provisions and immediately suffered an epidemic of cholera.

Lima was established as a village in 1841, and the town of Lima was organized March 29, 1842. Henry DeVilliers Williams was elected the first mayor and Amos Clutter was elected the first town marshal.

In 1848, Allen County's boundaries changed with a reorganization that created Auglaize County, Ohio, from the southern half of the original county. Town 2S, Range 7E (Monroe Twp.); Town 2S, Range 8E (Richland Twp.); the southern half of Town 2S, Range 5E, and the southern half of Town 2S, Range 6E (Sugar Creek Twp.) were transferred from Putnam County to Allen County. Parts of Van Wert and Mercer Counties were also transferred to Allen to form Spencer Township and part of Marion Township. In May 1853, Allen and Putnam Counties agreed on a cash settlement for Putnam's loss.

There were several practical implications of these changes to the boundaries of Allen County. Lima, the county seat, became near the county's center, rather than in the northern quarter. The county's western part gained a significant stretch of the Miami and Erie Canal, which was completed in 1845. The reorganization also brought the towns of Spencerville, laid out in 1844 on the canal, and Bluffton within the bounds of the county.

In 1885, oil was discovered in Lima. This began a boom in Allen County which lasted until after 1910.

Allen County Fair

One of Allen County's notable annual events is its County Fair. Run every August in Lima since 1851, the Fair is among Western Ohio's foremost agricultural showcasing events. In 2005, there were over 220,000 visitors and almost 3,000 exhibitors, making it the largest in the state.

The fair attracted many nationally known performers during the 1980s and 1990s, and combined with significant renovations to the county show grounds, these factors led to a marked increase in attendance and notoriety over the past two decades.

Geography

Adjacent counties
Putnam County (north)
Hancock County (northeast)
Hardin County (east)
Auglaize County (south)
Van Wert County (west)

Demographics

2000 census
As of the census of 2000, there were 108,473 people, 40,646 households, and 28,208 families living in the county. The population density was 268 people per square mile (104/km2). There were 44,245 housing units at an average density of 109 per square mile (42/km2). The racial makeup of the county was 84.95% White, 12.19% Black or African American, 0.21% Native American, 0.55% Asian, 0.01% Pacific Islander, 0.63% from other races, and 1.45% from two or more races. 1.42% of the population were Hispanic or Latino of any race. 33.8% were of German, 14.2% American, 8.8% Irish, and 6.6% English ancestry according to Census 2000.

There were 40,646 households, out of which 32.90% had children under the age of 18 living with them, 53.00% were married couples living together, 12.40% had a female householder with no husband present, and 30.60% were non-families. 26.30% of all households were made up of individuals, and 11.20% had someone living alone who was 65 years of age or older. The average household size was 2.52 and the average family size was 3.05.

In the county, the population was spread out, with 25.90% under the age of 18, 9.90% from 18 to 24, 27.60% from 25 to 44, 22.40% from 45 to 64, and 14.20% who were 65 years of age or older. The median age was 36 years. For every 100 females there were 100.00 males. For every 100 females age 18 and over, there were 98.00 males.

The median income for a household in the county was $37,048, and the median income for a family was $44,723. Males had a median income of $35,546 versus $23,537 for females. The per capita income for the county was $17,511. About 9.60% of families and 12.10% of the population were below the poverty line, including 17.00% of those under age 18 and 9.60% of those age 65 or over.

2010 census
As of the 2010 United States Census, there were 106,331 people, 40,619 households, and 26,982 families living in the county. The racial makeup of the county was 83.8% white, 11.9% black or African American, 0.7% Asian, 0.2% American Indian, 0.8% from other races, and 2.6% from two or more races. Those of Hispanic or Latino origin made up 2.4% of the population. In terms of ancestry, 34.7% were German, 12.6% were Irish, 9.7% were American, and 7.1% were English.

Of the 40,619 households, 31.7% had children under the age of 18 living with them, 48.0% were married couples living together, 13.8% had a female householder with no husband present, 33.6% were non-families, and 27.8% of all households were made up of individuals. The average household size was 2.47 and the average family size was 3.01. The median age was 38.3 years.

The median income for a household in the county was $43,632 and the median income for a family was $55,549. Males had a median income of $43,277 versus $31,148 for females. The per capita income for the county was $21,713. About 12.0% of families and 16.3% of the population were below the poverty line, including 25.1% of those under age 18 and 6.8% of those age 65 or over.

Politics
Although strongly Democratic up to World War I, when the only Democrat to lose the county was Alton B. Parker in 1904, Allen County has since become a very solid Republican county. Along with Delaware, Fulton, Hancock and Union, it was one of five Ohio counties to remain loyal to Barry Goldwater in 1964, and the last Democrat to carry the county was Franklin Roosevelt in his 1936 landslide.

|}

Communities

Cities
Delphos (part)
Lima (county seat)

Villages

Beaverdam
Bluffton (part)
Cairo
Elida
Harrod
Lafayette
Spencerville

Townships

Amanda
American
Auglaize
Bath
Jackson
Marion
Monroe
Perry
Richland
Shawnee
Spencer
Sugar Creek

Census-designated places
Fort Shawnee

Other unincorporated communities

Allentown
Conant
Gomer
Hume
Joliet
Kemp
Landeck
Maysville
Needmore
Oakview
Rockport
Rousculp
Scotts Crossing
Slabtown
South Warsaw
Southworth
West Newton
Westminster
Yoder

See also
Allen County Regional Transportation Authority
National Register of Historic Places listings in Allen County, Ohio
List of counties in Ohio

Notes

References

External links
Allen County Government's website

 
1831 establishments in Ohio
Populated places established in 1831